The men's individual competition of the archery events at the 2015 Pan American Games will be held between July 14 and 18 at the Varsity Stadium. The defending Pan American Games champion is Brady Ellison of the United States.

Schedule
All times are Central Standard Time (UTC-6).

Results

Ranking round

Competition rounds

Finals

Top half

Bottom half

References

Archery at the 2015 Pan American Games